Shitennō-ji (Temple of the Four Heavenly Kings) is a Buddhist temple in Ōsaka, Japan. It is also known as Arahaka-ji, Nanba-ji, or Mitsu-ji. The temple is sometimes regarded as the first Buddhist and oldest officially-administered temple in Japan, although the temple complex and buildings have been rebuilt over the centuries, with the last reconstruction taking place in 1963. It is the head temple of the Wa Sect of Buddhism.

History 
Prince Shōtoku was known for his profound Buddhist faith when Buddhism was not widespread in Japan during the 6th century. In order to popularize Buddhism, Prince Shōtoku lead a massive national project to promote Buddhism and he commissioned the construction of Shitennō-ji. Prince Shōtoku invited three Korean carpenters from Baekje. They brought knowledge and led the construction of Shitennō-ji. The commission of Shitennō-ji was part of a massive national project led by Prince Shōtoku.

The temple buildings themselves have been rebuilt a few times over the centuries; most of the present structures are from when the temple was last completely rebuilt in 1963. One of the members involved in the initial construction of the temple in the 6th century later established the firm Kongō Gumi, which specialized in temple and shrine buildings. Kongō Gumi was the world's oldest company until it was acquired by the Takamatsu Construction Group in 2004.

Description 
"Shitennō" refer to the Four Heavenly Kings in Buddhism. The temple Prince Shōtoku built to honor them had four institutions, each to help the Japanese attain a higher level of civilization. Three of the four sections are known to have existed inside the temple in Kamakura period.

Further to the west is a stone torii, which is imagined to be the Eastern Gate to Sukhavati, the Pure Land of the West. 

In the Kameido hall is a 7th century turtle-shaped stonework that was used for state rituals with water. These are 2 turtle-shaped objects in opposite direction. The stone tank and upper turtle's base were carved from single pieces of Tatsuyama stone. These are similar to the carving at the Sakafuneishi ruins which are believed to be a ritual site for Empress Kōgyoku (594-661) in Asuka, Nara Prefecture. Nowadays they are still used for rituals to commemorate ancestors by floating sheets of wood with their names on the water.

Souvenirs of Shitennō-ji are sold on the 21st of each month.

Access
a 5-minute walk from Shitennoji-mae Yuhigaoka Station on the Osaka Municipal Subway Tanimachi Line.
a 15-minute walk from Tennoji Station on the JR West Lines and the Osaka Municipal Subway Lines.
a 15-minute walk from Osaka Abenobashi Station on the Kintetsu Minami-Osaka Line.

Gallery

See also 

 For an explanation of terms concerning Japanese Buddhism, Japanese Buddhist art, and Japanese Buddhist temple architecture, see the Glossary of Japanese Buddhism.
List of National Treasures of Japan (archaeological materials)
List of National Treasures of Japan (crafts: others)
List of National Treasures of Japan (crafts: swords)
List of National Treasures of Japan (paintings)
List of National Treasures of Japan (writings)
Thirteen Buddhist Sites of Osaka
Historical Sites of Prince Shōtoku

References

External links

Shitennō-ji (Japanese)

 
Religious organizations established in the 6th century
Buddhist temples in Osaka
Important Cultural Properties of Japan
Historic Sites of Japan
6th-century establishments in Japan
Zen gardens
Buddhist relics
Prince Shōtoku
Buddhism in the Asuka period
6th-century Buddhist temples
Religious buildings and structures completed in 593